Christophe Larrieu is a French classical pianist and music conductor.

A pupil of Annie d'Arco and Lucette Descaves, first prize for piano, accompaniment and  vocal conductor at the Conservatoire de Paris, Larrieu also studied conducting.

While working as a vocal conductor on numerous lyrical productions, he regularly accompanies singers and instrumentalists in France and abroad.

An eclectic musician, he is also known, within the framework of the ensemble "Sorties d'Artistes" for his performances in salon and genre music as in jazz.

Since 1997 he has been deputy conductor at the Théâtre du Capitole de Toulouse where he directed in particular La mascotte, La Fille de madame Angot, Les Mousquetaires au couvent, La Périchole, as well as Benjamin Britten's The Little Sweep and Noye's Fludde, initiation operas for children.

References

External links 
 Christophe Larrieu concert
 Christophe Larrieu (Auditorium Lyon)

21st-century French male classical pianists
20th-century French male classical pianists
French male conductors (music)
Conservatoire de Paris alumni
Date of birth missing (living people)
Year of birth missing (living people)
Living people
21st-century French conductors (music)